This is a list of the National Register of Historic Places listings in Dakota County, Minnesota.  It is intended to be a complete list of the properties and districts on the National Register of Historic Places in Dakota County, Minnesota, United States.  Dakota County is located in the southeastern part of the U.S. state of Minnesota, bounded on the northeast side by the Upper Mississippi River and on the northwest by the Minnesota River.  The locations of National Register properties and districts for which the latitude and longitude coordinates are included below, may be seen in an online map.

Dakota County's historic sites convey the county's significant historical trends, including the settlement at Mendota, the homes of well-heeled residents of Hastings, the ethnic gathering places in South Saint Paul, and other sites related to life on the prairie, including religion, education, transportation, commerce, and the business of farming.

There are 38 properties and districts listed on the National Register in the county.  A supplementary list includes three additional sites that were formerly listed on the National Register.

History

The earliest European settlement occurred on what is now Picnic Island, in 1819, where Colonel Henry Leavenworth built a stockade fort called "St. Peter's Cantonment" or "New Hope;" there materials were assembled for the construction of Fort Snelling, to be built on the bluff on the north side of the Minnesota River. Permanent settlement on the island was impossible due to annual flooding.

Mendota
The next significant white settlement occurred in the area known as St. Peters, now Mendota, where Alexis Bailey built some log buildings to trade in furs in 1826. Henry Hastings Sibley built the first stone house in Minnesota there in 1836, overlooking Fort Snelling across the river. Sibley was a partner in the American Fur Company, and considerable fur trade occurred at Mendota, where the Mississippi and Minnesota Rivers converge. By the time Minnesota achieved statehood in 1858, power and influence had shifted from Mendota, across the rivers to Saint Paul and Minneapolis.

Hastings
By this time and continuing into the 20th century, the hub of activity in the county was in Hastings, the county seat, and a focal point of transportation, communication, and commerce.  Hastings is critically located on the Mississippi River at the confluence of the St. Croix River and on the Vermillion River, which provided ample water power. Commercial interests built substantial wealth among the businessmen who dealt in lumber, milling, and railroads as the county residents depended on them to sell their agricultural products and to provide the goods needed for a growing economy and rising standard of living.

South Saint Paul
Into the early twentieth century, the stockyards and meat-packing plants in South Saint Paul became historically significant, as they were the largest stockyards in the world; this is where ranchers in the vast countryside to the west brought their livestock for shipping to the hungry populations of St. Louis, Memphis, and New Orleans, downstream. These plants were worked by new immigrants from Romania, Serbia, and other Eastern European countries.

Current listings

|}

Former listings

|}

See also
 List of National Historic Landmarks in Minnesota
 National Register of Historic Places listings in Minnesota

References

External links

 Historic Sites—Dakota County Historical Society

Dakota County